"What Is Life" is a 1970 song by George Harrison, later covered by Olivia Newton-John.

What Is Life may also refer to:
 "What Is Life?" (Black Uhuru song), a song from the 1984 album Anthem
 What Is Life?, a 1944 book by physicist Erwin Schrödinger
 What Is Life?, a 1947 book by evolutionary biologist J. B. S. Haldane
 What Is Life (to me without thee), a translation of Gluck's Che Faro Senza Euridice from his 1762 opera Orfeo ed Euridice.
 "What is Life?" (Adventure Time), 15th episode of American animated television series Adventure Time season 1
 What Is Life? (album), 2021 by Brett Kissel

See also
 Life
 Meaning of life